José Luis Ribera Uranga (born 1 June 1965 in Azkoitia, Gipuzkoa) is a Spanish former footballer who played as a central defender, currently a manager.

Honours

Player
Real Burgos
Segunda División: 1989–90

Deportivo
Copa del Rey: 1994–95
Supercopa de España: 1995

References

External links

1965 births
Living people
People from Azkoitia
Spanish footballers
Footballers from the Basque Country (autonomous community)
Association football defenders
La Liga players
Segunda División players
Segunda División B players
Real Sociedad B footballers
Real Sociedad footballers
SD Eibar footballers
Sestao Sport Club footballers
Real Burgos CF footballers
Deportivo de La Coruña players
Rayo Vallecano players
Basque Country international footballers
Spanish football managers
Segunda División managers
Segunda División B managers
Tercera División managers
SD Eibar managers
Sestao River managers
Real Unión managers
Real Sociedad non-playing staff
Villarreal CF non-playing staff